Åsen Station is a railway station located in the village of Åsen in the municipality of Levanger in Trøndelag county, Norway.  It is located on the Nordland Line. The station is served hourly by SJ Norge's Trøndelag Commuter Rail service to Steinkjer and Trondheim. The station also serves Frosta via bus routes provided by AtB.

History

The station was opened as Aasen on 29 October 1902 on the Hell–Sunnan Line railway line between Hell Station and Levanger Station as the section to Levanger was finished. Åsen was designed by architect Paul Due and was built with a surrounding park. In April 1921, the name of the station was changed to the current Åsen. The current building is from 1944, but it is no longer used by the railway.

The station building was completely renovated in 2009, both inside and out. The station's 1st floor is home to the local business Åsenvøgga, that sell locally produced goods such as knitted products and various other hand-made crafts.

The stations platform was extended in 2020, to accommodate new passenger trains used on the Nordland line.

References

Railway stations in Levanger
Railway stations on the Nordland Line
Railway stations opened in 1902
1902 establishments in Norway
National Romantic architecture in Norway
Art Nouveau railway stations